The Eastern League of Minor League Baseball is A Double-A baseball league in the United States that began play in 1923. A league champion has determined at the end of each season. Champions have been determined by postseason playoffs, winning the regular season pennant, or being declared champion by the league office. For 2019, the league operated under a split season format in which the first place teams from each division in both the first and second halves of the season qualified for the playoffs. In the event that the same team won both halves, the team with the best win–loss record over the full season qualified. The first and second half winners then competed in a best-of-five series to determine division champions. The division winners then played each other in a best-of-five series to determine a league champion. As of 2022, the winners of each division from both the first and second halves of the season meet in a best-of-three division series, with the winners of the two division series meeting in a best-of-three championship series.

The 2020 season was cancelled due to the COVID-19 pandemic, and the league ceased operations before the 2021 season in conjunction with Major League Baseball's (MLB) reorganization of Minor League Baseball. In place of the Eastern League, MLB created the Double-A Northeast, a 12-team circuit divided into two divisions. Prior to the 2022 season, MLB renamed the Double-A Northeast as the Eastern League, and it carried on the history of the league prior to reorganization. In 2021, the Double-A Northeast held a best-of-five series between the top two teams in the league, regardless of division standings, to determine a league champion.

League champions
Score and finalist information is only presented when postseason play occurred. The lack of this information indicates a declared league champion.

Championship wins by team

Current EL teams appear in bold.

Notes
 Williamsport and York finished the season with identical win–loss records. York defeated Williamsport, 3–1, in a championship series to determine the champion.
 Springfield and Williamsport were declared co-champions after inclement weather forced the cancellation of the playoffs.
 York was declared champion after inclement weather forced the cancellation of the playoffs.
 New Britain and Reading were declared co-champions after the playoffs were cancelled in the wake the September 11 terrorist attacks.

References

C
Eastern
Eastern League champions
Eastern League